25 Orionis, less commonly known by its Bayer designation Psi1 Orionis (ψ1 Orionis, ψ1 Ori) is a fifth-magnitude star in the constellation Orion. It lies among a dense cluster of low-mass pre-main-sequence stars in the Orion OB1a.

Stellar group
25 Orionis is the dominant member of a rich low-mass star region, first identified in 2005 in a statistical analysis of 2.5 million stars. It is one of several sub-associations within Orion OB1a, all thought to lie at around the same distance of 338 parsecs. Over 200 members of the 25 Orionis stellar group have been found, mostly T Tauri stars with spectral types of K and M and masses less than half the sun's. There are also around 60 hotter stars in the region, including the eruptive variable V346 Tauri.

Properties 

Like the star Pleione in the Pleiades open cluster, 25 Ori is a Be star with a gaseous circumstellar disk.  The SIMBAD astronomical database lists its spectral class as B1Vn.

25 Orionis is a fast rotator, clocking a rotational velocity of 316 km/s, significantly faster than Achernar's speed of 251 km/s in the constellation Eridanus.

25 Orionis is a Gamma Cassiopeiae variable star, and has been given the variable star designation V1086 Orionis. The General Catalog of Variable Stars lists its magnitude as varying between magnitude 4.92 and 4.96 in the visual (V) band - an amplitude only 0.04 magnitudes. However photometry by the Hipparcos satellite, which had a passband broader than the V band, showed a 0.145 magnitude range in brightness.

See also 
 Class B Stars
 Shell star

References

External links 
Jim Kaler's Stars, University of Illinois: 25 ORI (25 Orionis)
 Philippe Stee's in-depth information on: Hot and Active Stars Research
 Olivier Thizy's in-depth information on: Be Stars

Orion (constellation)

B-type main-sequence stars
Be stars
Orionis, Psi1
Orionis, 25
1789
35439
025302
BD+01 1005
Orionis, V1086